Elizabeth Caroline Hamilton Gray (née Johnstone, 1800 – 21 February 1887) was a Scottish historian and travel author, born in Alva, Clackmannanshire, as the eldest daughter of James Raymond Johnstone and granddaughter of the colonial businessman John Johnstone. After marrying John Hamilton Gray, a priest and genealogist, in June 1829, Gray moved to Bolsover Castle in England, where she lived until shortly before her death.

Research
Gray became interested in the history of the Etruscans after visiting an exhibition of their artefacts in London organised by Domenico Campanari in 1837. She pursued the subject on a visit to Italy in 1837–1839, drawing on contacts in German and Italian archaeological circles. In 1840 she published Tour to the Sepulchres of Etruria, which served as a travelogue and an account of her archaeological research. She then wrote a general History of Etruria: the first two volumes in 1843–1844 and the third in 1868. 

As a woman, Gray was attacked for conducting historical research. The explorer George Dennis, who went on to write his own history of the Etruscans, stated in a review of Gray's work in 1844 that "any deep or earnest investigation of matters connected with the social institution of a gentile nation is not properly within the female province."

Other than her research on Etruria, Gray wrote a work on the classical and early medieval church and empire, and two popular children's histories of Rome. She and her husband maintained a collection of antiquities acquired both from dealers in Italy and from her own excavations. It included an unusual red-and-black Etruscan amphora in an Italo-Geometric style, known as the "Hamilton Gray vase".

Elizabeth Caroline Gray died on 21 February 1887.

Works
 (1843 ed.)
 (Vol. 1, 2, 3)
 (1858 ed.)

References

1800 births
1887 deaths
Date of birth missing
19th-century Scottish women writers
Scottish travel writers
British women travel writers
British women historians
British women archaeologists
British archaeologists
Historians of antiquity
Classical archaeologists
People from Clackmannanshire
People from Bolsover
Linguists of Etruscan